Leon Lučev (born 1970 in Šibenik) is a Croatian actor. He had his feature film debut in Vinko Brešan's 1996 comedy How the War Started on My Island. Since then, he has amassed lead roles in numerous high-profile European films, including Sex, Drink and Bloodshed (2004), What Is a Man Without a Moustache? (2005), Grbavica (2006), The Melon Route (2006), Behind the Glass (2008), On the Path (2010), Silent Sonata (2011), Vegetarian Cannibal (2012), The Miner (2017) and Men Don't Cry (2017).

Lučev won the Golden Arena for Best Supporting Actor at the 2008 Pula Film Festival, for his role in Will Not End Here. He was awarded the Heart of Sarajevo two times,  for Buick Riviera in 2008 and The Load in 2018.

Apart from his film work, he regularly performs in the Croatian National Theatre in Rijeka. He provides the voice of Lightning McQueen in the Croatian dub of the Cars franchise (2006-2017) and voiced Nigel in the Croatian-language version of Finding Nemo (2003).

Selected filmography

Awards and nominations

References

External links
 

1970 births
Living people
People from Šibenik
Croatian male actors
Golden Arena winners
Croatian Theatre Award winners
Croatian male stage actors
Croatian male television actors
Croatian male film actors
Croatian male voice actors
Croatian theatre directors
Croatian television directors
Croatian comedians